Hydroxycarboxylic acid receptor 1 (HCA1), formerly known as G protein-coupled receptor 81 (GPR81), is a protein that in humans is encoded by the HCAR1 gene. HCA1, like the other hydroxycarboxylic acid receptors HCA2 and HCA3, is a  G protein-coupled receptor (GPCR). The primary endogenous agonist of HCA1 is lactic acid (and its conjugate base, lactate).

Lactate activates HCA1, which in turn inhibits lipolysis in fat cells.

References

Further reading 

 
 
 

G protein-coupled receptors